Run, Simon, Run (also known as The Tradition of Simon Zuniga) is a 1970 American made-for-television thriller film from Aaron Spelling starring Burt Reynolds.

It featured the last performance of Inger Stevens.

Plot
Simon Zuniga, a Papago man, is struck by Carroll Rennard's car while he is running down the road after being released from prison. She drives him to the reservation, where she also works. There as he sleeps on his brother's grave, he dreams about the night that his brother was shot by Henry Burroughs and how Henry framed him for the murder.
Simon is informed that he is to take over as head of the tribal council. When girls are brought out at a public event to perform a "Dance of the 20 Virgins", Simon leads a protest by standing and covering his eyes, causing the girls to leave in embarrassment.
Simon later overhears Santana mention Burroughs and learns that Henry is still alive. Now free and stronger than ever, Simon seeks revenge on Henry by breaking into his old home but only finds new renters. He is arrested and Carroll pays his bail. She drives him to Tucson and hires Cesar Rosetti, a private detective.
Simon and Carroll become romantically involved and she holds a party for him to meet her friends. They ask him to do a rain dance but he says that he doesn't need rain. Carroll confesses to a friend that she is pregnant with Simon's child.
Rosetti tells Simon that Burroughs moved around from Albuquerque to Phoenix but is now living under the name Henry Bagley and is currently fishing nearby. Simon finds the house then waits until dark and sneaks inside. He ties up Henry and carries him outside then waits for sunrise. He cuts Henry loose and says that he will kill Henry with the dagger he places in the ground. Henry grabs the knife first and after a battle Simon gets the knife and stabs Henry in the stomach but is then shot by the other men from the house. Carroll makes her way to a road and convinces a bus reserved for the tribe to take her back to the reservation with them.

Cast
 Burt Reynolds as Simon Zuniga
 Inger Stevens as Carroll Rennard
 Royal Dano as Sheriff Tacksberry
 James Best as Henry Burroughs
 Rodolfo Acosta as Manuel
 Don Dubbins as Freddie Tomb
 Joyce Jameson as Esther
 Barney Phillips as Cesar Rosetti
 Herman Rudin as Asa
 Eddie Little Sky as Santana
 Ken Lynch as Warden Lomis
 Rosemary Eliot as Marilyn
 Marsha Moode as Helen Polino
 Martin G. Soto as Ignacio

Production
Reynolds starring role in Run, Simon, Run followed another TV movie, Hunters Are for Killing (1970).

It was shot in Tucson in February and March 1970.

Reception
It was the fifth highest-rated program of the week.

References

External links
 
 Run, Simon Run at BFI

1970 television films
1970 films
1970s thriller films
ABC Movie of the Week
Films about Native Americans
Films directed by George McCowan
Films produced by Aaron Spelling
Films set in Arizona
Films shot in Tucson, Arizona
American thriller television films
1970s American films